In enzymology, a Z-farnesyl diphosphate synthase is an enzyme that catalyzes the chemical reaction

geranyl diphosphate + isopentenyl diphosphate  diphosphate + (2Z,6E)-farnesyl diphosphate

Thus, the two substrates of this enzyme are geranyl diphosphate and isopentenyl diphosphate, whereas its two products are diphosphate and (2Z,6E)-farnesyl diphosphate.

This enzyme belongs to the family of transferases, specifically those transferring aryl or alkyl groups other than methyl groups.  The systematic name of this enzyme class is geranyl-diphosphate:isopentenyl-diphosphate geranylcistransferase. This enzyme is also called (Z)-farnesyl diphosphate synthase.

References

 

EC 2.5.1
Enzymes of unknown structure